Philip Vance Voyles (May 12, 1900 – November 3, 1972) was an outfielder in Major League Baseball. He played for the Boston Braves in 1929.

References

External links

1900 births
1972 deaths
Major League Baseball outfielders
Boston Braves players
Baseball players from North Carolina
People from Murphy, North Carolina